Kelontekemäjärvi is a medium-sized lake in the Kemijoki main catchment area. It is located in Kittilä municipality in the region Lapland in Finland. Historically the lake has been a border mark between the Sami villages of Kittilä and Sodankylä.

See also
List of lakes in Finland

References

Lakes of Kittilä